The term postfeminism (alternatively rendered as post-feminism) is used to describe reactions against contradictions and absences in feminism, especially second-wave feminism and third-wave feminism. The term postfeminism is sometimes confused with subsequent feminisms such as fourth-wave feminism and xenofeminism.

The ideology of postfeminism is recognized by its contrast with prevailing or preceding feminism. Some forms of postfeminism strive towards the next stage in gender-related progress, and as such is often conceived as in favor of a society that is no longer defined by rigid gender roles and expressions. A postfeminist is a person who believes in, promotes, or embodies any of various ideologies springing from the feminism of the 1970s, whether supportive of or antagonistic towards classical feminism.

Postfeminism can be considered a critical way of understanding the changed relations between feminism, popular culture and femininity. Postfeminism may also present a critique of second-wave feminism or third-wave feminism by questioning their binary thinking and essentialism, their vision of sexuality, and their perception of relationships between femininity and feminism. It may also complicate or even deny entirely the notion that absolute gender equality is necessary, desirable or realistically achievable.

History of the term
In 1919, a journal was launched in which "female literary radicals" stated we're interested in people now—not in men and women, that "moral, social, economic, and political standards 'should not have anything to do with sex, that it would "be 'pro-woman without being anti-man, and that "their stance [is called] 'post-feminist.

The term was used in the 1980s to describe a backlash against second-wave feminism. Postfeminism is now a label for a wide range of theories that take critical approaches to previous feminist discourses and includes challenges to the second wave's ideas. Other postfeminists say that feminism is no longer relevant to today's society. Amelia Jones has written that the postfeminist texts which emerged in the 1980s and 1990s portrayed second-wave feminism as a monolithic entity and were overly generalizing in their criticism.

The 1990s saw the popularization of this term, in both the academic world as well as the media world. It was seen as a term of both commendation and scorn. Toril Moi, a professor at Duke University, originally coined the term in 1985 in Sexual/Textual politics to advocate a feminism that would deconstruct the binary between equality based on "liberal" feminism and difference-based or "radical" feminism. There is confusion surrounding the intended meaning of "post" in the context of "postfeminism". This confusion has plagued the very meaning of "postfeminism" since the 1990s. While the term has seemed on the one hand to announce the end of feminism, on the other hand it has itself become a site of feminist politics.

Currently, feminist history is characterized by the struggle to find out the present situation—often articulated as a concern about whether there is still such a thing called "feminism"—by writing in the past. It is here that the meaning of "post" as a historical break is troubling, for "post" offers to situate feminism in history by proclaiming the end of this history. It then confirms feminist history as a thing of the past. However, some claim that it is impossible that feminism could be aligned with "post" when it is unthinkable, as it would be the same as calling the current world a post racist, post-classist, and post-sexist society.

Over the years, the meaning of postfeminism has broadened in scope, encompassing many different meanings, as is the case with feminism. Within feminist literature, definitions tend to fall into two main categories: 1) “death of feminism”, “anti-feminism”, “feminism is irrelevant now” and 2) the next stage in feminism, or feminism that intersects with other “post-” philosophies/theories, such as postmodernism, post-structuralism and postcolonialism.

Characteristics

The early part of the 1980s was when the media began labeling teenage women and women in their twenties the "postfeminist generation". After twenty years, the term postfeminist is still used to refer to young women, "who are thought to benefit from the women's movement through expanded access to employment and education and new family arrangements but at the same time do not push for further political change", Pamela Aronson, Professor of Sociology, asserts. Postfeminism is a highly debated topic since it implies that feminism is "dead" and "because the equality it assumes is largely a myth".

According to Prof. D. Diane Davis, postfeminism is just a continuation of what first- and second-wave feminisms want.

Research conducted at Kent State University narrowed postfeminism to four main claims: support for feminism declined; women began hating feminism and feminists; society had already attained social equality, thus making feminism outdated; and the label "feminist" was disliked due to negative stigma.

Examples of postfeminist work

In her 1994 book Who Stole Feminism? How Women Have Betrayed Women, Christina Hoff Sommers considers much of modern academic feminist theory and the feminist movement to be gynocentric. She labels this "gender feminism" and proposes "equity feminism"—an ideology that aims for full civil and legal equality. She argues that while the feminists she designates as gender feminists advocate preferential treatment and portray women as victims, equity feminism provides a viable alternative form of feminism. These descriptions and her other work have caused Hoff Sommers to be described as an antifeminist by some other feminists.

Some contemporary feminists, such as Katha Pollitt or Nadine Strossen, consider feminism to hold simply that "women are people." Views that separate the sexes rather than unite them are considered by these writers to be sexist rather than feminist.

Amelia Jones has authored post-feminist texts which emerged in the 1980s/1990s and portrayed second-wave feminism as a monolithic entity and criticized it using generalizations.

One of the earliest modern uses of the term was in Susan Bolotin's 1982 article "Voices of the Post-Feminist Generation", published in New York Times Magazine. This article was based on a number of interviews with women who largely agreed with the goals of feminism, but did not identify as feminists.

Susan Faludi, in her 1991 book Backlash: The Undeclared War Against American Women, argued that a backlash against second wave feminism in the 1980s had successfully re-defined feminism through its terms. She argued that it constructed the women's liberation movement as the source of many of the problems alleged to be plaguing women in the late 1980s. She also argued that many of these problems were illusory, constructed by the media without reliable evidence. According to her, this type of backlash is a historical trend, recurring when it appeared that women had made substantial gains in their efforts to obtain equal rights.

Angela McRobbie argued that adding the prefix post- to feminism undermined the strides that feminism made in achieving equality for everyone, including women. In McRobbie's opinion, postfeminism gave the impression that equality has been achieved and feminists could now focus on something else entirely. McRobbie believed that postfeminism was most clearly seen on so-called feminist media products, such as Bridget Jones's Diary, Sex and the City, and Ally McBeal. Female characters like Bridget Jones and Carrie Bradshaw claimed to be liberated and clearly enjoy their sexuality, but what they were constantly searching for was the one man who would make everything worthwhile.

Representations of post feminism can be found in pop culture. Postfeminism has been seen in media as a form of feminism that accepts popular culture instead of rejecting it, as was typical with second wave feminists. Many popular shows from the 1990s and early 2000s are considered to be postfeminist works because they tend to focus on women who are empowered by popular cultural representations of other women. Because of this, postfeminists claimed that such media was more accessible and inclusive than past representations of women in the media; however, some feminists believe that postfeminist works focus too much on white, middle-class women. Such shows and movies include The Devil Wears Prada, Xena: Warrior Princess, The Princess Diaries, and Buffy the Vampire Slayer. Another example is Sex and the City. Carrie Bradshaw from Sex and the City is an example of a character living a postfeminist life. While her character attempts to live a sexually liberated lifestyle, Bradshaw is stuck endlessly pursuing the love and validation of a man. The balance between Bradshaw's independent life as a successful columnist and desire to find a husband exemplifies the tension of post feminism.  Many of these works also involve women monitoring their appearance as a form of self-management, be it in the form of dieting, exercise, or—most popularly—makeover scenes. Postfeminist literature—also known as chicklit—has been criticized by feminists for similar themes and notions. However, the genre is also praised for being confident, witty, and complicated, bringing in feminist themes, revolving around women, and reinventing standards of fiction. Examples can also be found in Pretty Little Liars. The novels explore the complexity of girlhood in a society that assumes gender equality, which is in line with postfeminism. The constant surveillance and self policing of the series' protagonists depicts the performance of heterosexuality, hyperfemininity, and critical gaze forced upon girls. The materialism and performance from the girls in Pretty Little Liars critiques the notion that society has full gender equality, and thus offers a critique of postfeminism.

In an article on print jewelry advertisements in Singapore, Michelle Lazar analyses how the construction of 'postfeminist' femininity has given rise to a neo-liberal hybrid "pronounced sense of self or 'I-dentity'". She states that the increasing number of female wage earners has led to advertisers updating their image of women but that "through this hybrid postfeminist I-dentity, advertisers have found a way to reinstall a new normativity that coexists with the status quo". Postfeminist ads and fashion have been criticized for using femininity as a commodity veiled as liberation.

See also
 Angela McRobbie, Professor for Communications at Goldsmiths, University of London
 Gender studies
 Lad culture (British)
 Rosalind Gill, Professor of Social and Cultural Analysis at King's College, London
 Travesti (gender identity)
 Womanism

References

 Feminism, Ethics, and History, or What Is the "Post" in Postfeminism? Misha Kavka Tulsa Studies in Women's Literature Vol. 21, No. 1 (Spring, 2002), pp. 29–44.

Further reading
 

Politics
Feminism
Criticism of feminism
Feminism and society
Women in society